Isaak Bacharach (2 December 1854  – 22 September 1942) was a German mathematics professor in Erlangen who proved the Cayley–Bacharach theorem on intersections of cubic curves.

He was murdered at the Theresienstadt concentration camp during The Holocaust.

References

External links

1854 births
1942 deaths
19th-century German mathematicians
20th-century German mathematicians
Algebraic geometers
German people who died in the Theresienstadt Ghetto
People from Seligenstadt